Oliver Møystad (15 June 1892 – 28 June 1956) was a Norwegian engineer, farmer and forest owner. During the Norwegian Campaign in April 1940 he commanded Norwegian troops at the Battle of Midtskogen. During the German occupation of Norway, he served as leader of the collaborationist security police from 1941 to 1943, and Hirden from 1942 to 1944. After the war, Møystad was convicted of treason, sentenced for 10 years of forced labor, and fined NOK 150,000 during the legal purge in Norway after World War II. He was released in 1950.

References

1892 births
1956 deaths
Norwegian farmers
20th-century Norwegian engineers
Norwegian landowners
Norwegian Army personnel of World War II
Members of Nasjonal Samling
People convicted of treason for Nazi Germany against Norway